Bull-dog Drummond (later Bulldog Drummond) was the first Bulldog Drummond novel. It was published in 1920 and written by H. C. McNeile under the pen name Sapper. The following year it was adapted into a play of the same title starring Gerald du Maurier. In 1929, the book was adapted into a film of the same name starring Ronald Coleman.

Plot

The novel begins with ex-British Army Captain Hugh "Bulldog" Drummond, DSO, MC, a wealthy former World War I officer of the Loamshire Regiment, dashing and strong, but not handsome, placing an advertisement in The Times stating his desire for an adventure. He receives a reply from a young woman, concerned about some business acquaintances of her father. It turns out that her father is being blackmailed by archvillain Carl Peterson who is attempting to organise a coup d'état to enable a pro-communist takeover of Britain. This is being done for financial gain as Peterson is being paid by wealthy foreigners who will profit from this.

Drummond is captured several times, and manages to escape several times, before eventually defeating Peterson and his henchmen, with the aid of ex-army friends.

References

External links

 
 
 Review: Bulldog Drummond by 'Sapper' The Guardian
 

1920 British novels
British crime novels
Hodder & Stoughton books
Novels about coups d'état